"États d'Amour" is a song performed by French-Israeli singer Amir Haddad. The song was released as a digital download on 25 August 2017 by Warner Music Group as the lead single from his upcoming third studio album Addictions (2017). The song was written by Amir Haddad, Renaud Rebillaud and Nazim Khaled. The song has peaked at number 15 on the French Singles Chart, and also charted in Belgium.

Commercial performance
On 2 September 2017, the song entered the French Singles Chart at number 15 in its first week of release, making it Amir's third top 40 single in France, the song dropped to number 163 the following week.

Lyric video
An official lyric video to accompany the release of "États d'Amour" was first released onto YouTube on 24 August 2017 at a total length of three minutes and thirty-eight seconds.

Music video
An official music video to accompany the release of "États d'Amour" was first released onto YouTube on 20 September 2017 at a total length of three minutes and forty-six seconds.

Track listing

Charts

Release history

References

2016 songs
2017 singles
French pop songs
Amir Haddad songs
Warner Music Group singles
Songs written by Nazim Khaled
Songs written by Renaud Rebillaud
Songs written by Amir Haddad